Jennifer Anne Russell (born August 2, 1987 in Boston) is an American women’s lacrosse player. Having played with the North Carolina Tar Heels at the collegiate level, she was named to the US national team for the 2015-16 season. In 2016, she was selected by the Boston Storm with their second pick overall in the inaugural United Women's Lacrosse League Draft.

Playing career

NCAA

Russell served as a three-time captain with the North Carolina Tar Heels, playing at the midfield position. She would graduate from the program with 119 points, scoring 93 goals. Her 38 goals in 2009 led all Tar Heels players, as she scored at least one goal in 19 of 21 games. Russell’s season-high was a four-goal effort against the Oregon Ducks. In her senior season (2010), she was recognized as one of the tri-captains, leading the team with 22 caused turnovers.

USA Lacrosse

A member of the US Developmental Team from 2008–10, she would play in her first World Cup in 2013. At the 2013 Women's Lacrosse World Cup, Russell competed at the defender position and picked up seven ground balls and forced five turnovers, helping the US capture the gold medal.

Awards and honors
2009 All-ACC first team 
2009 ACC Academic Honor Roll 
2009 IWLCA All-America first team 
2009 NCAA All-Tournament team 
2009 Tar Heel Leader of Distinction Award
2010 All-ACC first team 
2010 IWLCA All-America first team 
2010 Tewaaraton Award finalist

References

1987 births
Living people
American lacrosse players
North Carolina Tar Heels women's lacrosse players
World Games gold medalists
Competitors at the 2017 World Games